The Almighty RSO was an American hip hop group from Boston, Massachusetts. Members included MCs E-Devious (Marco Antonio Ennis, later known as Antonio Twice Thou), Ray Dog (Ray Scott, later known as Benzino), Tony Rhome and DJ Deff Jeff.

History
One of their first breakthroughs was winning the ICA B-Town Rap Battle in 1986. In 1988 they released the single, "We're Notorious."  Current Boston hip hop favorite  Akrobatik said "Initially I would think of RSO Crew who were from here and making any type of noise. Locally, if I turned on the radio, those would be the guys that I would know who they were and follow their songs. I've definitely been checking them out from the beginning."

In 1991, 17-year-old Rodney "Rock" Pitts joined as a MC referred by his cousin Big Hurst who was member of the Legion of Doom, the groups answer to the S1Ws. Rock was stabbed to death by a bouncer at a night club shortly after the group signed a deal with Tommy Boy Records.

In 1994 they released the EP Revenge of da Badd Boyz which created controversy with the single "One in the Chamba," which was inspired by two killings of youths by Boston Police. The  Boston Police Patrolmen's Association (BPPA) pressed charges against the group under a state law that prohibits inciting assaults against public figures. The Almighty RSO spent a short period being part of Queen Latifah's Flavor Unit, appearing on the album Rollin' With The Flavor.

In 1996, they produced their first full-length LP, Doomsday: Forever RSO, which included the singles "You Could Be My Boo" featuring Faith Evans, "The War's On" featuring Mobb Deep and "You'll Never Know.

In 1998, Scott (now known as Benzino) and Ennis (now known as Twice Thou) formed the group Made Men with Cool Gsus and released an album entitled Classic Limited Edition.

Discography

Studio albums
Doomsday: Forever RSO (1996)

Extended plays
Revenge of da Badd Boyz (1994)

Other related releases
Wiseguys – In Tha Company of Killaz (1996)
Made Men – Classic Limited Edition (1998)
Hangmen 3 – No Skits Vol. 1 (2000)

References

External links

East Coast hip hop groups
Musical groups from Boston
Tommy Boy Records artists
Rap-A-Lot Records artists
RCA Records artists
Hardcore hip hop groups